Apopyros is a genus of flowering plants belonging to the family Asteraceae.

Its native range is Brazil to Northeastern Argentina.

Species:

Apopyros corymbosus 
Apopyros warmingii

References

Asteraceae
Asteraceae genera